Platythecium hypoleptum is a species of corticolous (bark-dwelling), crustose lichen in the family Graphidaceae.

Taxonomy
The lichen was first formally described as a species new to science in 1863 by Finnish botanist William Nylander, as a member of the genus Graphis. Nylander noted some similarity with Graphis homographiza, and also compared it to Graphis dividens (now Phaeographis dividens). In 2002, Bettina Staiger proposed a transfer to genus Thalloloma, based on a reorganisation of family Graphidaceae that stressed the importance of ascocarps and their accessory organs as characteristics to delimit genera. A year later, Minoru Nakanishi and Hiroyuki Kashiwadani suggested that the taxon should instead be in genus Platythecium.

References

Graphidaceae
Lichen species
Lichens described in 1863
Taxa named by William Nylander (botanist)
Lichens of Asia
Lichens of North America
Lichens of South America